Robert Wallis (born 1904; date of death unknown) was an English footballer who played one game as a goalkeeper for Port Vale in May 1925.

Career
Wallis played for Trentham before joining Port Vale in July 1924. He played his only league game for the Second Division club on the last day of the 1924–25 season, a 1–1 draw with Fulham at Craven Cottage on 2 May. Regular number one Tom Fern was out and back-up Sidney Brown had conceded four goals at Old Trafford seven days previous. Having not being selected since, he was released from The Old Recreation Ground at the end of the 1925–26 season.

Career statistics
Source:

References

1904 births
Year of death missing
Sportspeople from Hanley, Staffordshire
English footballers
Association football goalkeepers
Port Vale F.C. players
English Football League players